Karalar railway station is a railway station in the village of Güney in the Niğde Province of Turkey. The station consists of a side platform serving one track, with two more tracks as sidings. The O-21A motorway crosses over the station, however no connection is directly available.

TCDD Taşımacılık operates a daily intercity train, the Erciyes Express, from Kayseri to Adana.

References

External links
TCDD Taşımacılık
Passenger trains
Station timetable

Railway stations in Niğde Province